Heteroplectron californicum is a species of caddisfly in the family Calamoceratidae. It is found in North America.

References

Trichoptera
Articles created by Qbugbot
Insects described in 1871